Alvis Wayne (December 31, 1937 – July 31, 2013) was an American rockabilly singer.

Career

Alvis Wayne Samford was born in Paducah, Texas and listened to country music on the radio as a child and was given a guitar at age ten. He began playing in local bars and clubs at 12 and joined Tony Wayne & the Rhythm Wranglers at 20. This group released one single in 1957 and then disbanded. Following this, Alvis signed with Westport Records.

He recorded enough for Westport to put out an LP; though none were released, his single "Don't Mean Maybe Baby" was a regional hit in Texas, and he toured extensively in the state. He put his career in music on hold and joined the Air Force in 1960; after his tour of duty, he continued recording and performing.

In subsequent decades, Alvis became the subject of a cult following in the United Kingdom, where his singles were in great demand. In 2000, Wayne signed with Rolling Rock Records and released two full-length albums, Rockabilly Daddy (2000) and Proud of My Rockabilly Roots (2001).

Singles

References

Sources
 Profile, allmusic.com; accessed August 17, 2015.

1937 births
2013 deaths
American rockabilly musicians
Musicians from Texas
Place of death missing
People from Paducah, Texas
Country musicians from Texas